The 2019 German Football League season is the 41st edition of the top-level American football competition in Germany.

The regular season starts on 27 April and will be finished on 8 September 2019, followed by the play-offs. The season culminated in the German Bowl XLI, which will be held on 12 October 2019 in Frankfurt.

Modus

During the regular season each club plays all other clubs in its division twice, home and away, resulting in each team playing 14 regular season games. There are no games between clubs from opposite divisions, interconference games having been abolished after the 2011 season.

The best four teams in each division qualify for the play-offs where, in the quarter finals, teams from opposite divisions play each other, whereby the better placed teams have home field advantage. The first placed team plays the fourth placed from the other division and the second placed the third placed team. From the semi-finals onwards teams from the same division can meet again.

The eighth placed team in each division enter a two-leg play-off with the winner of the respective division of the German Football League 2, the second tier of the league system in Germany. The winners of this contest qualify for the GFL for the following season.

League tables

GFL
The league tables of the two GFL divisions:

North

South

GFL2
The league tables of the two GFL2 divisions:

North

South

Relegation and Promotion round

Play-offs
This year all play-off games were won by the home teams and the Dresden Monarchs found their match in the Schwäbisch Hall Unicorns for the fourth time in five years (losing their semifinals to them in 2014, 2015, 2016 and 2018). This losing streak would only end in German Bowl XLII which again saw Schwäbisch Hall face the Monarchs, but this time the Saxonians prevailed. Avenging the previous year's semifinal defeat against Frankfurt, Braunschweig once again reached the German Bowl, which would be played in Frankfurt's Waldstadion this year. In a low scoring affair, Braunschweig snapped a fifty-game winning streak of Schwäbisch Hall that had started in 2017 and won their twelfth national championship by a final score of 10–7 in German Bowl XLI.

References

External links
 Official GFL website 

German
Football League
German Football League seasons